The Hogup Mountains are a small 25-mile (40 km)  long mountain range located in central Box Elder County, Utah, United States. The range lies on the northwest perimeter of the Great Salt Lake, and also lies surrounded by the Great Salt Lake Desert; it lies in the desert's northeast.

Three major peaks are found in the mountain's center, Tangent and Scorpio Peaks, and Shelter Mountain. Also, 3 mi east in the Great Salt Lake, an outlying peak is named Dolphin Island.

Description
The Hogup Mountains have a central section containing the three major peaks; the mountain range narrows both northerly and southerly into the Great Salt Lake Desert, but the northeast does have another small 7 mi ridgeline that trends exactly NNW x SSE.

Mountain peaks
Broom Mountain, anchors the southern mountain section on the named Hogup Ridge. The central peaks are Scorpio Peak (southeast), and due west, Shelter Mountain, . In the center-north lies the range highpoint, Tangent Peak, .

Access
The south of the Hogup Mountains can be accessed from Lakeside, 14 mi ESE. The north of the range can be accessed from Kelton; also Park Valley on Utah State Route 30.

References

External links
Tangent Peak, mountainzone (coordinates)

Great Salt Lake Desert
Mountain ranges of Box Elder County, Utah
Mountain ranges of the Great Basin
Mountain ranges of Utah